The 2017–18 Troy Trojans women's basketball team represents Troy University during the 2017–18 NCAA Division I women's basketball season. The Trojans, led by sixth year head coach Chanda Rigby, play their home games at Trojan Arena and were members of the Sun Belt Conference. They finished the season 18–13, 12–6 in Sun Belt play to finish in a tie for third place. They advanced to the semifinals of the Sun Belt Tournament where they lost to Little Rock.

Previous season
They finished the season 22–11, 12–6 in Sun Belt play to finish in third place. They defeat Arkansas State, Texas–Arlington and Louisiana–Lafayette to become champions of the Sun Belt Tournament to earn an automatic trip to the NCAA women's tournament. They lost in the first round to Mississippi State.

Roster

Schedule

|-
!colspan=9 style=|  Exhibition

|-
!colspan=9 style=| Non-conference regular season

|-
!colspan=9 style=| Sun Belt regular season

|-
!colspan=9 style=| Sun Belt Women's Tournament

Rankings
2017–18 NCAA Division I women's basketball rankings

See also
 2017–18 Troy Trojans men's basketball team

References

Troy Trojans women's basketball seasons
Troy